Enrique Washington Olivera Castro (born June 25, 1954 in Montevideo, Uruguay), known as Washington Olivera, is a coach and former footballer who played for clubs in Uruguay, Argentina, Chile, the United States and El Salvador, as well as the Uruguay national football team. He played as a forward. He is also the father of professional footballer Bryan Olivera.

Teams
 Montevideo Wanderers 1975-1978
 Peñarol 1979
 O'Higgins 1980
 Tampa Bay Rowdies 1980-1981
 Cobreloa 1981-1983
 Nacional 1983
 Progreso 1984-1985
 Provincial Osorno 1985
 Racing Club 1986-1987
 Toluca 1987–1990
 Luis Ángel Firpo 1990-1991

Titles
 Cobreloa 1982 (Chilean Championship)

Honours
 Cobreloa 1983 (Top Scorer Chilean Championship)

Notes

References

External links
 
 NASL stats

1954 births
Living people
Uruguayan footballers
Uruguayan expatriate footballers
Uruguay international footballers
Uruguayan football managers
Montevideo Wanderers F.C. players
Club Nacional de Football players
Peñarol players
C.A. Progreso players
Racing Club de Avellaneda footballers
Cobreloa footballers
Provincial Osorno footballers
Provincial Osorno managers
O'Higgins F.C. footballers
C.D. Luis Ángel Firpo footballers
Expatriate footballers in Chile
Expatriate footballers in Argentina
Expatriate footballers in El Salvador
Expatriate football managers in Chile
Expatriate soccer players in the United States
Tampa Bay Rowdies (1975–1993) players
North American Soccer League (1968–1984) players
North American Soccer League (1968–1984) indoor players
Chilean Primera División players
Association football forwards